Gelechia sattleri is a moth of the family Gelechiidae. It was described by Piskunov in 1982. It is found in Armenia and Kazakhstan.

The larvae feed on Juniperus polycarpos.

References

Moths described in 1982
Gelechia